Thanh Bình may refer to several places in Vietnam:

Thanh Bình District, a rural district of Đồng Tháp Province
Thanh Bình, Đà Nẵng, a ward of Hải Châu District
Thanh Bình, Biên Hòa, a ward of Biên Hòa in Đồng Nai Province
Thanh Bình, Điện Biên, a ward of Điện Biên Phủ
Thanh Bình, Hải Dương, a ward of Hải Dương
Thanh Bình, Ninh Bình, a ward of Ninh Bình
Thanh Bình, Bù Đốp, a township and capital of Bù Đốp District in Bình Phước Province
Thanh Bình, Đồng Tháp, a township and capital of Thanh Bình District
Thanh Bình, Chương Mỹ, a commune of Chương Mỹ District in Hanoi
Thanh Bình, Sa Pa, a commune of Sa Pa in Lào Cai Province
Thanh Bình, Tiền Giang, a commune of Chợ Gạo District
Thanh Bình, Hớn Quản, a commune of Hớn Quản District in Bình Phước Province
Thanh Bình, Mường Khương, a commune of Mường Khương District in Lào Cai Province
Thanh Bình, Trảng Bom, a commune of Trảng Bom District in Đồng Nai Province
Thanh Bình, Vĩnh Long, a commune of Vũng Liêm District